Eugoa aequalis is a moth of the family Erebidae first described by Francis Walker in 1858. It is found on Borneo, Peninsular Malaysia and Sumatra. The habitat consists of lowland areas, where it is found in various forest types, including heath, coastal and secondary forests.

The ground colour is very pale grey with blackish bands.

References

Nudariina
Moths of Borneo
Moths described in 1858